Sikao is a district (amphoe) in the northwestern part of Trang province, Thailand.

History
Sikao district was established in 1887. The present district office was opened 1 March 1987. Sikao District's administrative office is in Bohin Sub-district (Sikao townships)

Geography
Neighboring districts are (from the northwest clockwise): Khlong Thom of Krabi province; Wang Wiset, Mueang Trang, and Kantang of Trang Province. To the west is the Andaman Sea.

Administration
The district is divided into five sub-districts (tambons), which are further subdivided into 40 villages (mubans). There are two townships (thesaban tambons). Sikao covers parts of tambon Bo Hin, and Khuan Kun covers parts of Kalase. There are a further five tambon administrative organizations (TAO).

Economy
Sikao is the one of the proposed entrances to the Thai Canal. It is designated as Route 9A. The canal would connect to the Gulf of Thailand, 135 km to the east.

References

External links
amphoe.com

Districts of Trang province